Eudemonic is a 2005 studio album by the Steve Kimock Band.

Track listing 
 "Eudemon" – 6:28
 "Ice Cream" – 8:01
 "The Bronx Experiment" – 8:04
 "Bouncer" – 4:15
 "In Reply" – 5:56
 "One for Brother Mike – 6:41
 "Elmer's Revenge" – 11:57
 "Moon People" – 6:34
 "Tongue N' Groove" - 8:36

References

2005 albums